Franz Xaver Nachtmann (September 6, 1799 – December 17, 1846) was a German painter. He attended the Academy of Fine Arts, Munich from 1814 to 1819. He later served as a flower painter at the Nymphenburg Porcelain Manufactory. He left Nymphenburg Porcelain Manufactory in 1827 and began working on landscape and architecture paintings. He died on December 17, 1846 after eight years of suffering a spinal disease.

Gallery

References

1799 births
1846 deaths
19th-century German painters
19th-century German male artists
German male painters
German landscape painters
German portrait painters
Flower artists